Joe Shield (b. June 26, 1962) is a former quarterback in the National Football League.

Biography
Shield was born Joseph Michael Shield on June 26, 1962, in Brattleboro, Vermont.

Career
Shield was drafted by the Green Bay Packers in the eleventh round of the 1985 NFL Draft and was a member of the team for two seasons. He played at the collegiate level at Trinity College.

See also

List of Green Bay Packers players

References

1962 births
Living people
American football quarterbacks
Green Bay Packers players
Trinity Bantams football players
People from Brattleboro, Vermont
Players of American football from Vermont